Irena Maria Nalepa (born 24 November 1951) is a Polish neuroscientist, pharmacologist and biochemist, professor of medical sciences and professor at the Institute of Pharmacology of the Polish Academy of Sciences.

She graduated from the Jagiellonian University and received her PhD in 1980. Since 2004 she has the title of full professor.

Currently she is a professor, Head of Department of Brain Biochemistry and vice-chairman of the Institute of Pharmacology of Polish Academy of Sciences, a chairwoman of Scientific Council of popular-science magazine Wszechświat and member of Neuroscience Committee of Polish Academy of Sciences.

References 

Polish biochemists
Polish women chemists
Polish neuroscientists
Polish women neuroscientists
Polish pharmacologists
Living people
1951 births
Academic staff of Jagiellonian University
Jagiellonian University alumni
Polish women academics
Physicians from Kraków